The Cleveland Indians were a professional ice hockey team in Cleveland, Ohio, that played home games in the Elysium Arena.

History 
In 1929, the Kitchener Dutchmen International Hockey League (IHL) franchise was transferred to Cleveland. In the summer of 1934, the team was renamed the Cleveland Falcons, and under that name became a charter member of the International-American Hockey League (now American Hockey League). Subsequently, the team was renamed the Cleveland Barons for the 1937–38 season, a name they kept until 1973. They folded after the 1973–74 season.

References 

Defunct ice hockey teams in Ohio
Indians
International Hockey League (1929–1936) teams